Eden Medical Center is a hospital and medical center located in Castro Valley, California, providing emergency medical services to Alameda County. It is operated by Sutter Health. It is built on an elevated area, and is visible from a distance.

History
The first hospital was built in 1954. The complex saw a major rebuild in the early 21st century. The new facility has been noted for its innovations in structural engineering and energy efficiency.

References

Landmarks in the San Francisco Bay Area
Hospitals in the San Francisco Bay Area
1954 establishments in California